Liberty Township is one of seven townships in Wabash County, Indiana, United States. As of the 2010 census, its population was 2,365 and it contained 991 housing units.

Geography

Cities, towns, villages
 La Fontaine

Unincorporated towns
 America at 
 Treaty at 
(This list is based on USGS data and may include former settlements.)

Adjacent townships
 Lagro Township (north)
 Polk Township, Huntington County (northeast)
 Wayne Township, Huntington County (east)
 Washington Township, Grant County (southeast)
 Pleasant Township, Grant County (south)
 Richland Township, Grant County (southwest)
 Waltz Township (west)
 Noble Township (northwest)

Cemeteries
The township contains these seven cemeteries: America, Gardner, Hale, Harper, Rennaker, Stone and Waggoner.

Lakes
 Mississinewa Lake

School districts
 Metropolitan School District of Wabash County Schools

Political districts
 Indiana's 5th congressional district
 State House District 22
 State Senate District 17

References
 United States Census Bureau 2007 TIGER/Line Shapefiles
 United States Board on Geographic Names (GNIS)
 IndianaMap

External links
 Indiana Township Association
 United Township Association of Indiana

Townships in Wabash County, Indiana
Townships in Indiana